Gilt Edge is a city in Tipton County, Tennessee. The population was 477 at the 2010 census and 456 in 2018, showing a decrease of 21.

Geography
Gilt Edge is located at  (35.533724, -89.830447). It lies at the intersection of State Route 59 and State Route 178, approximately 10 miles southwest of downtown Covington, directly adjacent to Burlison to the east, approximately 7 miles north of Munford, and approximately 4 miles east of the Mississippi River.

Demographics

As of the census of 2000, there were 489 people, 190 households, and 145 families residing in the city. The racial makeup of the city was 98.77% White, 0.41% African American, 0.20% Native American, 0.20% Pacific Islander, and 0.41% from two or more races. Hispanic or Latino of any race were 0.61% of the population.

There were 190 households, out of which 35.8% had children under the age of 18 living with them, 67.4% were married couples living together, 8.4% had a female householder with no husband present, and 23.2% were non-families. 19.5% of all households were made up of individuals, and 10.0% had someone living alone who was 65 years of age or older. The average household size was 2.57 and the average family size was 2.98.

In the city, the population was spread out, with 24.1% under the age of 18, 8.8% from 18 to 24, 30.5% from 25 to 44, 25.6% from 45 to 64, and 11.0% who were 65 years of age or older. The median age was 38 years. For every 100 females, there were 91.8 males. For every 100 females age 18 and over, there were 90.3 males.

The median income for a household in the city was $46,250, and the median income for a family was $55,625. Males had a median income of $31,875 versus $24,375 for females. The per capita income for the city was $21,491. About 5.8% of families and 9.7% of the population were below the poverty line, including 15.5% of those under age 18 and 11.6% of those age 65 or over.

References

Cities in Tennessee
Cities in Tipton County, Tennessee
Memphis metropolitan area